Mater Academy is a non-profit charter management organization based in Florida. They have a network of 49 schools in Florida and Nevada. Mater partners with Academica, a for-profit education management organization.

Origins
In 1968, Mother Margarita Miranda began Centro Mater as a childcare facility in Little Havana, a poor immigrant neighborhood of Miami, Florida. Translated from Latin it means, "Center Mother". It was successful and flourished. As a teenager, Fernando Zulueta had volunteered at the center and understood their situation. In 1996, the Florida Legislature authorized charter schools as part of the state's K-12 public education system.
One year after starting the Somerset Academy in Miramar, Florida he founded the not-for-profit Mater Academy. The following year, Zulueta incorporated the For-profit education school management company Academica. Mater Academy was successful and spread around Hialeah, Florida.  There were 14 Mater Academy schools in 2010 with over 6,300 students. Enrollment increased to 13,380 in 2015.

Operations
There were twenty-three employees of Mater Academy Inc making six figure salaries in 2020.

Awards & Rankings
Mater Academy Charter High School in Hialeah Gardens, Florida won a silver medal award from U.S. News & World Report in 2008 and 2009. They were also ranked the 41st best high school in Florida for 2021.

Mater Performing Arts and Entertainment Academy in Hialeah Gardens, Florida was ranked the 31st best high school in Florida for 2021.

Mater Academy East Charter High School in Miami was ranked the 32nd best high school in Florida for 2021.

Mater Academy Lakes High School in Hialeah Gardens, Florida was ranked the 62nd best high school in Florida for 2021.

Sports Leadership of Miami Charter High School in Little Havana (formerly Sports Leadership and Management/SLAM) was ranked the 486th best high school in Florida for 2021.

References

External links
 Mater Academy Schools

Charter schools in the United States
Charter management organizations